Scambina is a genus of moths of the family Erebidae. The genus was erected by Francis Walker in 1865.

Species
Scambina aliena Walker, 1865 Sierra Leone
Scambina cervina Walker, 1873
Scambina roseipicta (H. Druce, 1911) Cameroon

References

Calpinae